Lockwood is a census-designated place (CDP) in Yellowstone County, Montana, United States. It is not an organized city or town. Lockwood had the largest growth rate in the state of Montana with 57.8% growth since 2000. The 2010 census put Lockwood's population at 6,797. Lockwood is a suburb of Billings and is the second largest community in the Billings Metropolitan Area. Annexation of Lockwood to Billings has been studied; however, the June 2009 Billings City Council Annexation Plan states that the city has no plans to annex Lockwood in the foreseeable future. Lockwood is the site of a major Exxon refinery.

Geography
Lockwood is located at  (45.807504, -108.423600).

History
Lockwood bordered the Crow “Mitsiadazi” Reservation, in the 1800s. Cows replacing the buffalo brought an end to the plains Native Americans’ way of life. Lockwood was named after Captain Lockwood, reputed to have many victories fighting Native Americans and to have been a surveyor for the government who camped in the foothills in the late 1800s. In 1907, settlers opened a public road through Lockwood flats of heavy loam to the 2nd crossing of Dry Creek, to the Dry Creek Road traversing to the Reservation. The old Native American supply road is still etched into the side of the hill at the south end of Exxon Road which was later called Peter Hoe Road.

Lockwood Flats was home of the Johnson Ranch. Just to the southeast of the ranch, one can find reminisces of Cavalry camps as they stay in the area for a whole winter surveying the land for the federal government. The area known as Lockwood Flats was also originally the site of a stop called Hirsch, located just between Johnson Lane and old Coulson Road. A community began to develop around it, however, the topographical name Lockwood stuck, and the name Hirsch was eventually forgotten. On June 16, 1965, an F3 tornado touched down near Lockwood.  It was the strongest tornado ever recorded in Yellowstone County.

Today, Lockwood has grown to become the largest unincorporated community in the state of Montana and the 16th largest population center in the state. Lockwood is also one of the fastest-growing communities in Montana, with an estimated 58% increase between the 2000 and 2010 censuses. In 2010, Lockwood gained status as a Census Designated Place. Residents and local businesses are working with Yellowstone County and the City of Billings to create a framework for proper infrastructure and zone planning, as well as an eventual incorporation as an official municipality.

On October 24, 2013, Lockwood residents gathered for a large community meeting with 250 attendees to discuss and organize community interest, goals, and direction.  Pictures of the historic meeting were recorded of the event and posted on the new [www.lockwoodmontana.com community website].  Groups were organized and champions were chosen for many different issues whether it was for a high school, incorporation, better roads, Billings bypass, community garden, community festival, water & sewer, lighting, sidewalks, and businesses. A celebration was held one year from the historic gathering to celebrate the progress that had been made.

Demographics

As of the census of 2000, there were 6,797 people, 2,651 households, and 2,566 families residing in the CDP. The population density was 577.5 people per square mile (222.9/km2). There were 2,651 housing units at an average density of 224.8 per square mile (86.7/km2). The racial makeup of the CDP was 86.0% White, 0.4% African American, 4.5% Native American, 0.35% Asian, 0.12% Pacific Islander, 1.02% from other races, and 2.32% from two or more races. Hispanic or Latino of any race were 3.74% of the population.

There were 1,599 households, out of which 40.3% had children under the age of 18 living with them, 55.7% were married couples living together, 12.6% had a female householder with no husband present, and 26.3% were non-families. 20.8% of all households were made up of individuals, and 5.6% had someone living alone who was 65 years of age or older. The average household size was 2.69 and the average family size was 3.10.

In the CDP, the population was spread out, with 29.9% under the age of 18, 8.3% from 18 to 24, 31.7% from 25 to 44, 22.5% from 45 to 64, and 7.5% who were 65 years of age or older. The median age was 34 years. For every 100 females, there were 101.5 males. For every 100 females age 18 and over, there were 97.4 males.

Lockwood's census data shows that the Lockwood CDP has a population of 8,477 and a 2011 Median Household Income (MHI) of $47,059 compared to the State of Montana's MHI of $43,872. With this MHI it may make it more difficult to secure grants specific to low income residents.

Education
Lockwood Schools provides education from kindergarten through high school. Lockwood High School's team name is the Lions.

References

External links
 Lockwood Community Website Local community information

Census-designated places in Montana
Census-designated places in Yellowstone County, Montana
Billings metropolitan area